CPGA may stand for:

 Ceramic pin grid array, a kind of a package for integrated circuits
 Cornish Pilot Gig Association